Bullet for Stefano (also known as The Ferryman) is a 1947 Italian adventure-drama-crime film written and directed by Duilio Coletti and starring Rossano Brazzi and  Valentina Cortese. It is  loosely based on real-life events of Stefano Pelloni (1824-1851), an Italian highwayman known as "Il Passatore". It grossed 146.2 million lire at the Italian box office.

Plot

Cast 

Rossano Brazzi as Stefano Pelloni 
Valentina Cortese as  Barbara Montanari
Carlo Ninchi as Don Morini
Camillo Pilotto as Count Gigiazzo Ghilardi
Liliana Laine as Countess Isolina Ghilardi
Carlo Campanini as  Peppino
Gualtiero Tumiati as  Stefano's Father
 Bella Starace Sainati as Stefano's Mother
Giovanni Grasso as  Lazzarini
Folco Lulli as The Monk
Alberto Sordi as  Innamorato
Carlo Tamberlani as  Maresciallo Borghi
Pupella Maggio as  Marta 
Franco Balducci as Giacomo  
Enrico Luzi as Poor Student 
Memmo Carotenuto as Thief

References

External links

Italian adventure films
1947 adventure films
Biographical films about Italian bandits
Italian black-and-white films
1940s adventure drama films
Films scored by Enzo Masetti
1940s Italian films